The Austria women's national under-18 basketball team is a national basketball team of Austria, administered by the Austrian Basketball Federation. It represents the country in women's international under-18 basketball competitions.

The team finished 12th at the 1975 European Championship for Junior Women. They also participated at several FIBA U18 Women's European Championship Division B tournaments.

See also
Austria women's national basketball team
Austria women's national under-16 basketball team
Austria men's national under-18 basketball team

References

External links
Archived records of Austria team participations

B
Women's national under-18 basketball teams